The Basque pelota competition at the 2019 Pan American Games was held from August 4 to August 10, 2019 in Lima, Peru.

Medal summary

Events 

The following events took place at the Villa María del Triunfo Sports Center:

Men's events

Women's events

Participating nations
Twelve nations participated:

References

External links
Results book

 
Events at the 2019 Pan American Games
2019
Pan American Games